Yevgeniy Ivchenko (26 June 1938 in Sumy Oblast, Ukrainian SSR – 2 June 1999) was a Soviet athlete who competed mainly in the 50 km walk. He trained at Trudovye Rezervy in Minsk.

He competed for the USSR in the 1980 Summer Olympics held in Moscow, Soviet Union in the 50 kilometre walk where he won the bronze medal. He also competed in the 20 kilometre walk in the 1972 Munich Olympics.

References

All Athletics profile
Brief biography of Yevgeniy Ivchenko

1938 births
1999 deaths
People from Sumy Oblast
Belarusian male racewalkers
Soviet male racewalkers
Olympic athletes of the Soviet Union
Olympic bronze medalists for the Soviet Union
Athletes (track and field) at the 1972 Summer Olympics
Athletes (track and field) at the 1980 Summer Olympics
Belarusian people of Ukrainian descent
Medalists at the 1980 Summer Olympics
Olympic bronze medalists in athletics (track and field)